Tregyb Woodlands is a Site of Special Scientific Interest (SSSI) in Carmarthen & Dinefwr, Wales. Designated as a SSSI since 1980 as a conservation effort to protect and conserve the site, its area is 27 hectares.

The woodland lies around 1 mile (1.6 km) to the west of the town of Llandeilo, and are within the Brecon Beacons National Park. Three woods make up the SSSI; Cae'r Coed, Big Grove and Warren Tregyb. The SSSI was first notified on 1 January 1980, under the powers of the National Parks and Access to the Countryside Act 1949. Following the passing of the Wildlife and Countryside Act 1981, the site was renotified on 23 March 1983 to bring it under the provisions of the new Act.

The woodlands are managed by the Woodland Trust, who also manage adjacent woodland outside of the designated SSSI area, creating a total wood 42 hectares in area.

References

External links
 Coed Tregib at the Woodland Trust

Sites of Special Scientific Interest in Carmarthen & Dinefwr